Jianshi Township is a mountain indigenous township in Hsinchu County in northern Taiwan. It had an estimated population of 9,532 as of February 2023. The main population is the indigenous Atayal people.

Administrative divisions

1 Yixing Village
2 Jiale Village
3 Xinle Village
4 Jinping Village
5 Meihua Village
6 Xiuluan Village
7 Yufeng Village

Tourist attraction
 Dabajian Mountain
 Tapung Old Fort

Notable natives
 Joanne Tseng, actress and singer
 Landy Wen, singer

References

External links

 

Townships in Hsinchu County